Ka I are a Macanese football club which currently competes in the Liga de Elite.

History

Founded in Taipa in 1985 under the name Associacão Desportiva Ka I, the club has seven titles to its name: three Liga de Elite titles and four Taça de Macau. They have been one of the best clubs in Macau since their debut in Liga de Elite in 2009.

Led by Japanese midfielder Dan Ito, the club made their debut in Liga de Elite in 2009 season, where they managed to finish in second place in the standings, just behind Lam Pak, while winning their first trophy, Taça de Macau. It continued in 2010 season with a Cup-Championship double and in 2011 season the club became champion for the third consecutive year. The club changes its name before the start of the 2016 season to become Tak Chun Ka I, after about a year known as Windsor Arch Ka I.

Despite its many national titles, the club have so far never taken part in an Asian competition as Macau does not field any team in competitions managed by the AFC then.

As of 2018 season the club became known again as Ka I.

In 2019, the club playing in the 2019 Taça de Macau was disqualified for doping against Hang Sai, which he took on in the preliminary round, winning 21-18, following a controversial match, the victory was given for Chao Pak Kei.

Honours

League
Liga de Elite 
Champions (3): 2010, 2011, 2012.

Cup Competitions
Taça de Macau
Champions (4): 2009, 2010, 2015, 2016
 Runners-up: 2013

Current squad
Squad for the 2020 Liga de Elite

See also
Ka I 21–18 Hang Sai

References 

Football clubs in Macau